Pel's pouched bat (Saccolaimus peli) is a species of sac-winged bat in the family Emballonuridae. It is found in Angola, Cameroon, Republic of the Congo, Democratic Republic of the Congo, Ivory Coast, Equatorial Guinea, Gabon, Ghana, Guinea, Kenya, Liberia, Nigeria, and Uganda. Its natural habitats are subtropical and tropical forests.

Sources

Emballonuridae
Mammals described in 1853
Taxonomy articles created by Polbot
Bats of Africa
Taxa named by Coenraad Jacob Temminck